Pagli ( Mad Girl), is a Pakistani romantic drama serial, which was first aired on 28 August 2017 on Hum TV. It stars Noor Hassan Rizvi, Hina Altaf, Asim Azhar and Hira Salman in lead roles.

It is based on the novel of same name by Shaukat Thanvi, written by Khurram Abbas and directed by Ali Masud Saeed.

It was dubbed in Pashto under the title لیونئ and aired on Hum Pashto 1.

Story
Dr. Khalid (Noor Hassan Rizvi) is a psychiatrist who has just completed his degree from America and is returning to Pakistan in order to be in his family and to establish a clinic there, When he reaches Pakistan, he decides to travel to his city in a train instead of a plane so that he can see his country properly, for he had been away for so long. In the train, he comes across a bubbly, upbeat and cheerful girl called Gulrukh (Hira Salman) who keeps Dr. Khalid entertained with her funny yet witty jokes. She tells him that his clinic is not going to give him good business since in Pakistan, no one wants to be called a psychic by going to a psychiatric clinic for help. Khalid tells her that he is engaged to his cousin Zubia. Much to Khalid's surprise, Gulrukh guesses a lot about Zubia, such as the fact that she must be a quiet girl who has not studied after her intermediate. Gulrukh tells him that Zubia is not the girl Khalid should marry and he should instead marry someone like herself (Gulrukh). This entertains Khalid. Gulrukh insists that Khalid should take her to his home so that she can show him why she is the perfect match for him, and after a little reluctance, Khalid agrees . 
They reach Khalid's home and Khalid is greeted warmly by the family members. However, Zubia and her mother are uncomfortable with Gulrukh's presence, though Khalid's mother welcomes her as Khalid's guest. Gulrukh remarks that Zubia is exactly like she imagined her. 
Meanwhile, an old man (Mehmood Aslam) and a boy (Asim Azhar) are seen seated at a police station. The old man is reporting that his daughter has disappeared and he blames the boy for his daughter's disappearance. This is shown in a comic way instead of showing it as a serious scene. The boy denies having been involved in the disppappearance of the girl. The girl's father gives her picture to the police and the girl turns out to be Gulrukh. 
Days pass and Zubia gets uncomfortable due to Gulrukh's closeness with Khalid. Gulrukh, after earning Khalid's love, realizes that she has made an enormous mistake by snatching away the innocent Zubi's love from her and in order to correct the situation she wants to leave the house but now Khalid loves her a lot and wants to marry her only. Gulrukh runs away from home when her father and "fiancé," Najam come to take her back to Lahore. Zubi, being a kind hearted and understanding girl, does not want Gulrukh to go as she wants Khalid to be with the girl he loves. Gulrukh is found and it is revealed that she has forgotten both her father and Najam. Khalid wants to give psychological help to Gulrukh. Meanwhile, love starts blossoming between Zubi and Najam when Gulrukh refuses to marry him. Khalid’s sister Shehzeen visits and wants Gulrukh, her father, and Najam to leave, because she wants Khalid and Zubi to get married.

Cast 
 Noor Hassan Rizvi as Dr. Khalid
 Hira Mani as Gulrukh
 Mehmood Aslam as Hakeem Karamat Ali
 Sajida Syed as Dr. Khalid & Shehzeen's mother
Hina Altaf as Zubaida "Zubi"
Saba Faisal as Zakkiya
Asim Azhar as Najam
 Mahjabeen Habib as Shehzeen
 Lubna Aslam as Gulrukh's mother
 Malik Raza as Munshee
 Faisal Naqvi as Hospital Doctor
 Faheem Tijani as Servant
 Faiza Ali as Hira

References

External links 
 Official Website

Pakistani drama television series
2017 Pakistani television series debuts
2018 Pakistani television series endings
Urdu-language television shows
Hum TV original programming
Hum TV